Chea Sim (15 November 19328 June 2015) was a Cambodian politician. He was President of the Cambodian People's Party from 1991 to 2015, President of the National Assembly of Cambodia from 1981 to 1998 (Vice President from June to October 1993) and President of the Senate from 1999 to 2015. His official title was Samdech Akka Moha Thomma Pothisal Chea Sim.

Life and career
Chea Sim was born on 15 November 1932, in Romeas Haek, Svay Rieng Province to an ethnic Chinese family. As a young man, he partook in one of the first revolutionary movement by the communist Khmer People's Revolutionary Party (Khmer: គណបក្សប្រជាជនបដិវត្តន៍កម្ពុជា, KPRP), currently the ruling party of Cambodia. The movement which he joined was against Colonial France in the early 1950s. He later became a military commander of the communist Khmer Rouge even before it finally toppled the US-backed Lon Nol government in 1975.

Like Heng Samrin and Hun Sen, he defected in 1978 from the Khmer Rouge, which was backed by China, and fled to Vietnam to join an anti-Khmer Rouge movement known as a resistance faction groomed by Vietnam. He later held positions in the new party and People's Republic of Kampuchea government, installed and backed by Vietnam after it invaded Cambodia and ousted the Khmer Rouge in 1979. He was among the founding members of the United Front for the National Salvation of Kampuchea, the Vietnam-backed group that defeated the Khmer Rouge in 1979.

Chea Sim was considered an important figure when negotiations happened, resulting in the 1991 Paris Peace Accord, which brokered a deal supposed to end three decades of civil war and paved the way for the U.N.-organized elections in 1993. After the elections, even though the royalist FUNCINPEC party topped the polls at that time, Hun Sen insisted that it share power with his Cambodian People's Party, and four years later grabbed the sole power for his Cambodia People's Party. 

From 6 April 1992 to 14 June 1993, Chea Sim served as the nation’s interim leader (Chairman of the Council of State) before Cambodia became a constitutional monarchy. He also acted as Head of State on behalf of King Norodom Sihanouk for brief periods in 1993, 1994, 1995 and 2004. Sihanouk awarded Chea Sim the honorary title of Sâmdech in 1993.

After the King announced his permanent abdication on October 7, 2004, Chea Sim once again became acting Head of State. In the same year, he was escorted out of the country after refusing to sign off as acting head of state on changing the constitution, which would eventually help the CPP and the Funcinpec parties form a coalition government under the deal between Hun Sen and prince Norodom Ranariddh. 

Many saw it as the first-ever public display of power struggle and infighting between Hun Sen and Chea Sim. Subsequently, Hun Sen continued his tactic of replacing Chea Sim's loyalists with his favourite candidates for important roles in the party and government. Chea Sim had led a powerful faction within the ruling CPP party which was at times at odds with Hun Sen and his supporters, but many describe Sim’s role after that as little more than symbolic.

Illness and death 
Chea Sim left the position of acting Head of State on 14 October 2004, when Norodom Sihamoni became king. He was absent from the 63rd anniversary celebrations of the CPP in June 2014, following years in which age and illness from high blood pressure, diabetes, and other chronic ailments forced him to back away from his roles and receive medical care in Vietnam. The Phnom Penh Post reported that  Hun Sen was publicly referred to as “acting CPP president” for the first time at the anniversary event. In the months leading to his death, Chea Sim's signature continued to appear on documents passed by the Senate, of which he was President, but which was in practice presided over by his Deputy President, Say Chhum. 

He died on 8 June 2015. His Majesty Norodom Sihamoni, King of Cambodia, signed a royal decree to establish a commission to organize the funeral of Chea Sim. The commission was chaired by Heng Samrin, President of the National Assembly along with three vice chairmen, including Prime Minister Hun Sen; Say Chhum, Acting President of Senate; Kong Sam Ol, Deputy Prime Minister and Minister of the Royal Palace. Cambodia scheduled a formal mourning ceremony for Chea Sim for 19 June 2015.

Commentary 
Human Rights Watch Asia Director Brad Adams described it as a "mockery of justice" that Chea Sim was able to continue being one of the rulers of the post-Khmer Rouge government without being brought to justice, as Chea Sim was accused of overseeing atrocities committed under his role as a military commander. Brad Adams also accused Chea Sim of operating "a police state" in the 1980s that arrested, imprisoned, and tortured Cambodian political activists without trial. 

Minister of Information Khieu Kanharith criticized The Phnom Penh Post for publishing an article which accused Chea Sim of violating human rights under the Khmer Rouge regime. Khieu Kanharith said that in the Cambodian tradition, respect for the dead is very important during the mourning ceremony and that The Phnom Penh Post could be sued if Chea Sim's family members wished to do so. 

AKP argued, in that barbaric regime, Samdech Chea Sim was just a simple local official. AKP argued Chea Sim and his family members were also victims (of the regime) as other Cambodian people. The spokesperson of the Ministry of Interior strongly rejected the comments made by Director of Asia Division for Human Rights Watch and quoted by The Phnom Penh Post.

Sam Rainsy, the leader and co-founder of the main opposition party, Cambodia National Rescue Party, and a member of Parliament (MP) for Kampong Cham since July 2014, hailed Chea Sim as a national hero and likened him to the popular late king Norodom Sihanouk who, Rainsy said, considered Chea Sim as his "little brother". Once considered as the second most powerful man in the government after Hun Sen, Chea Sim, as Rainsy said, was highly regarded for his patriotic ideals and national reconciliation after the Khmer Rouge.

See also
People's Republic of Kampuchea

References

|-

|-

|-

|-

|-

|-

 

1932 births
2015 deaths
Cambodian communists
Cambodian revolutionaries
Presidents of the Senate (Cambodia)
Cambodian politicians of Chinese descent
Interior ministers of Cambodia
Presidents of the National Assembly (Cambodia)
Members of the National Assembly (Cambodia)
Government ministers of Cambodia
Grand Cordons of the Order of the Rising Sun
People's Republic of Kampuchea
Heads of state of Cambodia
Cambodian People's Party politicians
Cambodian Theravada Buddhists
People from Svay Rieng province